was a baseball stadium in Nishinomiya, Hyōgo, Japan. The stadium was opened in 1937 and had a capacity of 35,000 people. It was used as a football and rugby stadium too.

It was primarily used for baseball and was home of the Orix Braves (Hankyu Braves), until they moved to Kobe Stadium, in 1991. In 1946, during the occupation of Japan while much of the country was being rebuilt, it was temporarily the shared home of the Nankai Hawks.

Queen performed a concert there for their Hot Space Tour in 1982. Madonna performed three sold-out concerts at the stadium during her Blond Ambition Tour in April 1990. Michael Jackson also performed three sold-out concerts at the venue during his Bad World Tour in 1987. Ayumi Hamasaki performed two sold-out concerts at the stadium during her Stadium Tour 2002 A.

The stadium was closed on December 31, 2002 and was demolished from September 1, 2004 until 2005.

Hankyu Nishinomiya Gardens, a shopping mall containing a Hankyu Department Store, an Izumiya supermarket, Toho cinemas, and dozens of smaller clothing, fashion, and food outlets, was opened on November 26, 2008, on the vacant lot where the stadium used to be.

See also
Nishinomiya-Kitaguchi Station

References

External links
Hankyu Nishinomiya Gardens official website
Picture of old Hankyu Nishinomiya Stadium

Defunct baseball venues in Japan
Defunct football venues in Japan
Orix BlueWave
Hankyu Railway
Defunct American football venues in Japan
Sports venues in Hyōgo Prefecture
1937 establishments in Japan
Sports venues completed in 1937
2002 disestablishments in Japan
Sports venues demolished in 2005
Nishinomiya
Demolished buildings and structures in Japan